Magnano is a comune (municipality) in the Province of Biella, Italy

Magnano may also refer to:

Magnano in Riviera, a comune (municipality) in the Province of Udine
Magnano (surname)